Roger Lapointe (born September 10, 1940) is a Canadian politician in the province of Quebec. He was a Liberal member of the National Assembly of Quebec from 1973 to 1976 and has been the mayor of Mont-Saint-Michel since 1997.

Early life and career

Lapointe was born in Ferme-Neuve, Quebec. He has a Bachelor of Arts degree (1961) and a teaching degree (1962) from the Université Laval, and in 1971 he earned a degree in educational administration from the Université de Montréal. Lapointe taught math and sciences in Mont-Laurier in the Commission scolaire Henri-Bourassa from 1962 to 1966, was coordinator of education from 1966 to 1970, and served as director of education from 1970 to 1973.

Lapointe was founder and president of the Commission scolaire Henri-Bourassa teaching association, and from 1964 to 1966 he was a member of the provincial council of the Corporation des enseignants du Québec. He also served as president of the board of directors of the Notre-Dame-de-Sainte-Croix hospital in Mont-Laurier in the early 1970s.

Legislator
Lapointe was elected to the National Assembly of Quebec in the 1973 provincial election, defeating Union Nationale incumbent Fernand Lafontaine in the division of Labelle. The Liberal Party won a landslide majority government in this election under Robert Bourassa's leadership, and Lapointe served for the next three years as a government backbencher. He was defeated by Parti Québécois candidate Jacques Léonard in the 1976 provincial election.

Return to education
Lapointe was director of educational services at the Commission scolaire Henri-Bourassa from 1979 to 1982, when he was hired in the same position at the Commission scolaire Pierre-Neveu. He was promoted to director general of the latter institution in 1985 and served in this role until 1997. From 1998 to 2003, he worked as an investment broker.

Mayor
Lapointe was elected as mayor of Mont-Saint-Michel in 1997 and has been re-elected without opposition in every election since. He became prefect of the municipalité régionale de comté d'Antoine-Labelle in 2005 and was re-elected in 2007 and 2009. On that latter occasion, he said that he would continue to work in areas such as road expansion, high speed internet access, and economic diversification planning. Lapointe is also active with the Fédération Québécoise des Municipalités.

In 2006, he accused the Quebec Federation of Labour of unnecessarily dragging out a strike in Ferme-Neuve.

Electoral record
Municipal

Source: Résultants 2009, Affaires municipales, Régions et Occupation du territoire Québec.

Source: Élections municipales 2005 - Résultats des élections pour les postes de maire et de conseiller, Affaires municipales, Régions et Occupation du territoire Québec.

Source: Élections municipales 2001 - Résultats des élections pour le poste de maire, Affaires municipales, Régions et Occupation du territoire Québec.

Provincial

Source: Official Results, Le Directeur général des élections du Québec.

Source: Official Results, Le Directeur général des élections du Québec.

External links

References

1940 births
Quebec Liberal Party MNAs
Living people
Université Laval alumni
Université de Montréal alumni